Youth is a 2017 Chinese coming-of-age drama film directed by Feng Xiaogang and written by Geling Yan. It was screened in the Special Presentations section at the 2017 Toronto International Film Festival. It was scheduled to be released in China on October 1, 2017, but after previews in Beijing and other cities was pulled from the National Day schedule.  It was released on 15 December 2017. It was the 6th highest-grossing domestic film of 2017 in China.

Synopsis
The film chronicles the lives of a group of idealistic adolescents in a military art troupe in the People's Liberation Army during the Cultural Revolution. They experience love, lust, betrayal, and sufferings in the background of Mao-era songs and dances. Through the narration of Xiao Suizi, the film follows the story of two key characters, Feng Liu and Xiaoping He. Xiaoping He, a naive, and innocent new recruit from Beijing, and Feng Liu a morally impeccable character, whose comrades praise for being a real life Lei Feng. The pair also participate in the Sino-Vietnamese War in 1979 and become heroes for their act of courage.

Xiaoping He eventually becomes the target of her roommates bullying for her provincial naive mannerisms. A majority of the acts spearheaded by Hao Shuwen, the daughter of the regional commander.

After the war, they are honorably discharged from the Army but struggle to make ends meet in the Reform-era China while they learn lessons from soul-crushing experiences of love, lust, betrayal, and heartbreak.

Cast
Huang Xuan (黄轩) as Liu Feng (刘峰)
Miao Miao (苗苗) as He Xiaoping (何小萍)
Zhong Chuxi (钟楚曦)  as Xiao Suizi (萧穗子)
Yang Caiyu (杨采钰) as Lin Dingding (林丁丁)
Li Xiaofeng (李晓峰) as Hao Shuwen (郝淑雯)
Wang Tianchen (王天辰) as Chen Can (陈灿)
Wang Keru (王可如) as Xiao Balei (小芭蕾)
Su Yan (苏岩) as the dance teacher
Zhao Lixin (赵立新) as the commissar
Sui Yuan (隋源) as Zhuoma (卓玛)
Zhang Renbo (张仁博) as Zhu Ke (朱克)

 Zhou Fang (周放) as the head nurse
 Xue Qi (薛祺) as Secretary Wu (吴干事)
 Yang Shuo (杨烁) as the military chief
 Tao Hai (陶海) as the Psychiatrist

Awards and nominations

References

Externals
 

2017 films
Chinese coming-of-age drama films
Films directed by Feng Xiaogang
Films with screenplays by Geling Yan
Huayi Brothers films
Films about communism
Films set in the 1970s
Sino-Vietnamese War films
2010s coming-of-age drama films
Asian Film Award for Best Film winners
2017 drama films
2010s Mandarin-language films